The 1946 Gator Bowl was the first inaugural game and it featured the Wake Forest Demon Deacons and the South Carolina Gamecocks, both from the Southern Conference.  It was one of only two bowl rematches of a regular season game that ended in a tie.

Background
This was the first bowl game appearance for either team. The two had played earlier in the season (November 22) in Charlotte, ending in a tie, 13–13. Wake Forest had finished 4–0–1 down the stretch, while South Carolina was 2–3–3, but were still invited to play.

Game summary
Nick Sacrinty scored for Wake Forest on a touchdown run to give them a 6–0 lead in the first quarter. South Carolina responded with a Bobby Giles touchdown run to have a 7–6 halftime lead. But Wake Forest would score three straight running touchdowns with two Dick Brinkley touchdowns and a Bob Smathers touchdown to have a 26–7 lead. South Carolina would have a touchdown late on an interception return, but Wake Forest held on to win with the run game being their strong suit, with 378 of their 396 yards being on the run, outgaining the Gamecocks.

Aftermath
Wake Forest did not play in another Gator Bowl until their win against Rutgers in the 2021 game, and would have to wait until the 1992 Independence Bowl for their next bowl win. South Carolina would not win a bowl game until the 1995 Carquest Bowl (January), on their ninth bowl appearance, with four being in Jacksonville.

Statistics

References

Gator Bowl
Gator Bowl
South Carolina Gamecocks football bowl games
Wake Forest Demon Deacons football bowl games
January 1946 sports events in the United States
Gator Bowl
20th century in Jacksonville, Florida